Herrick may refer to:

Places
Australia
Herrick, Tasmania, a locality

United States
Herrick, Illinois
Herrick, Ohio
Herrick, South Dakota
Herrick Township, Knox County, Nebraska
Herrick Township, Bradford County, Pennsylvania
Herrick Township, Susquehanna County, Pennsylvania
Herricks, New York

Other uses
Herrick (surname)
Operation Herrick, the codename for British military operations in Afghanistan
Herrick, a fictional character in the Fusion comic book series

See also
Herric, the pseudonym of French illustrator Chéri Hérouard